Katrina Shehab (née Shinfield, born 28 March 1971) is an Australian handball player. As Katrina Shinfield, she was a member of the Australia women's national handball team. She was part of the  team at the 2000 Summer Olympics, playing five matches. The Australian team were beaten by Angola into tenth place.

References

1971 births
Living people
Handball players at the 2000 Summer Olympics
Australian female handball players
Olympic handball players of Australia